This is a List of trainer aircraft (練習機 Renshuu-ki - Trainer) the Japanese used during World War II.
Names in quotes are Allied code names for clarity for English speakers and do not reflect the Japanese usage.

Purpose-Built Trainers

Basic trainers
 Tachikawa Ki-24 Basic training glider
 Kokusai Ki-86/K9W1 "Cypress" (Bücker Bü 131 built under license)
 Tachikawa Ki-9 "Spruce"
 Tachikawa Ki-17 "Cedar"
 Kawanishi K8K Navy Type 0 Primary Trainer Seaplane
 Mitsubishi K3M Navy Type 90 "Pine" also used by Army as Ki-7
 Yokosuka K5Y Navy Type 93 "Willow"
 Tokyo Koku Ki-107

Advanced trainers
 Mansyu Ki-79 (1 or 2 seat version of Ki-27 fighter modified for training)
 Tachikawa Ki-55 "Ida" (Version of Ki-36 "Ida" modified for training)
 Tachikawa Ki-54 (Model b) "Hickory" (modified for training)
 Nakajima Ki-34 "Thora" (advanced flying and paratroop trainer)
 Kyushu K10W1 Oak Intermediate/Advanced Trainer and Target tug
 Mitsubishi K7M Multi-engine trainer
 Kyushu K11W Shiragiku Navy Operations Trainer
 Mitsubishi A5M A5M2-K "Claude" (2 seat version of fighter)
 Mitsubishi A6M Zero A6M5-K "Zero" (2 seat version of fighter)
 Aichi M6A1-K Nanzan Land based trainer version of Aichi M6A Seiran floatplane.

Combat Aircraft used as Trainers
Many of these were either obsolete types used as trainers, or for crew familiarization similar in concept to the British use of OTU/OCU units and are not strictly trainers.

Fighter trainers
 Nakajima Type 91 (NC)
 Kawasaki Ki-10 "Perry"
 Nakajima Ki-27 "Nate"
 Nakajima Ki-43 "Oscar"
 Nakajima Ki-44 Shoki "Tojo"
 Nakajima Ki-84 Hayate "Frank"
 Kawasaki Ki-61 Hien "Tony"
 Kawasaki Ki-100 Goshikisen
 Kawasaki Ki-45 Toryu "Nick" (Heavy Fighter)
 Yokoi (Ku) Ki-13 Shusui (Rocket/Jet)

Reconnaissance trainers
 Mitsubishi Ki-15 "Babs"
 Mitsubishi Ki-46 (II KAI) "Dinah"

Light bomber trainers
 Kawasaki Type 88 (KDA-2)
 Kawasaki Ki-3
 Nakajima Ki-4
 Mitsubishi Ki-30 "Ann"
 Kawasaki Ki-32 "Mary"
 Tachikawa Ki-36 "Ida"
 Kawasaki Ki-48 "Lily"
 Mitsubishi Ki-51 "Sonia"

Twin-engined bomber trainers
 Mitsubishi Ki-1
 Mitsubishi Ki-2 "Louise"
 Mitsubishi Ki-21 "Sally"
 Nakajima Ki-49 Donryu "Helen"
 Mitsubishi Ki-67 Hiryu "Peggy"

Transport trainers
 Kokusai Ki-59 "Theresa"
 Tachikawa Type LO "Thelma"

World War II Japanese fighter aircraft
Imperial Japanese Army
Japan, training